The Indian Hills Theater in Omaha, Nebraska, United States, was a movie theater built in 1962 showcasing films in the Cinerama wide-screen format. Its location was at 8601 West Dodge Rd. The theater's screen was the largest of its type in the United States. Despite the protests of local citizens, Hollywood legends, and the National Trust for Historic Preservation, the theater was demolished in 2001 by Nebraska Methodist Health System for a parking lot.

Construction history

The theater was built for Swanson Enterprises of Omaha at a cost of US$1 million by A. Borchman Sons Company. The theater was designed by architect Richard L. Crowther of Denver, Colorado, a Fellow of the American Institute of Architects. Crowther designed each element of the theater to enhance the Cinerama experience, and the design included a cylindrical shape and a flat roof. The original blueprints for the theater are in the Denver Public Library Special Collections Department. Following construction, the theater was leased to the Cooper Foundation of Lincoln, Nebraska for exhibition of films in the Cinerama format.

The interior auditorium was circular in shape and seated 810 patrons, with 662 on the main floor and 148 on the balcony. The auditorium was wheelchair-accessible and spaces were specifically designed for wheelchair-using patrons. The screen extended from the floor to the ceiling and was the largest indoor movie screen in the United States at the time of construction. The screen consisted of 2,500 strips of one-inch, perforated tape called louvers. Twenty speakers in five mountings were evenly spaced behind the screen—four speakers on each side of the theater and eight speakers in the rear. The speakers were "Voice of the Theater" models manufactured by Altec Lansing Co. The three projection booths required for Cinerama were located on the main floor of the auditorium, with one in the center and the other two evenly spaced between the center and side walls.

In 1978, a smaller rectangular-shaped theater called "Cameo" was built to the east of the main theater. In 1987, two additional smaller rectangular theaters were built to the west of the main theater. In 2000, Carmike Cinemas installed a Sony Dynamic Digital Sound system in the main auditorium, new seats, a new curved screen and new curtains. In July 2001, the Cameo and the two smaller theaters were demolished, and the main auditorium was demolished the following month.

Functional description
In 1962, a night at the Indian Hills Theater was like a night at the opera. A patron would call in advance to purchase reserved seats, referred to in the trade as a "hard ticket sell." Upon arrival at the theater the patrons would drive up to the entrance where a doorman would open the door to the lobby. Reserved seat tickets would be picked up at the box office and a tuxedo-attired usher would walk the patron into the auditorium and point out the seats with a flashlight. The concession stands offered only an orange drink in a specially shaped container and imported candies. Refreshments were not permitted in the seats. Patrons entering the theater would hear the film musical score from the speakers behind the screen. As the lights dimmed the curtains would reveal the massive curved screen. The projected image would nearly fill the viewer's field of vision. The multi-channel sound, combined with the screen image, created a three-dimensional experience. At intermission, patrons would gather at the side lounges of the auditorium, the lobby, or the patio.

From Cinerama to 70 mm
The final Cinerama film to be shown at the Indian Hills was How the West Was Won which played for forty two weeks until it closed in March 1964. Thereafter the theater played regular first-run films through a single projector in the 70 mm or 35 mm format. In 1968 2001: A Space Odyssey was presented in the 70 mm format and billed as Cinerama.

Architectural and historical significance
Cinerama was a panoramic screen format invented by Fred Waller. It followed Waller's earlier eleven-camera, eleven-projector "Vitarama" process, first presented in 1939 at the New York World's Fair, which proved too unwieldy for widespread commercial deployment. Cinerama featured a three-camera, three-projector process that projected three film images side by side on a deep curved screen to recreate a lifelike image.

The curved screen was designed to take advantage of the effect of peripheral images in the viewer's eye and create the feeling that the viewer was in the picture. A state-of-the-art, multi-track stereo sound system heightened the sense of realism. Prior to the first Cinerama production, movies were projected on a nearly-square flat screen and the sound was one-channel monophonic. As a result of Cinerama the film industry adopted the single-projector wide-screen format and stereophonic sound as the norm. At the peak of Cinerama's popularity, there were over 200 theaters in the world capable of projecting Cinerama films. Most of these were existing theaters adapted to use the Cinerama process. Ten theaters, however, were built specifically for Cinerama films. The Martin Corporation built such theaters in New Orleans, Seattle, and St. Louis. Others were located in Atlanta, Los Angeles, Cuba, and Japan. Of the ten theaters designed for Cinerama, three near-identical "Super-Cineramas" were built in Denver (Cooper Theater) (1961), Minneapolis (Cooper Theater) (1961), and Omaha (Indian Hills Theater) (1962). Only three (3) theaters remain that are configured to show Cinerama. These theaters are located in Seattle (Martin Cinerama Theater), Los Angeles (Cinerama Dome), and Bradford, England (National Media Museum). Only the theater in England has regular showings of Cinerama films.

A series of popular Cinerama films were produced in the 1950s and early 1960s. Due to the prohibitive cost of the Cinerama production process, the epic How the West Was Won was the last film shot using the Cinerama process, although later motion pictures (2001, A Space Odyssey, for example) that could take advantage of the wide screen, were marketed as "Cinerama" films.

The Indian Hills Theater was the movie palace of its day. As the final "Super-Cinerama" theater, it contained refinements to the design which resulted in the finest Cinerama theater ever built. It was designed with a modern functional style. The design reflected the "form follows function" philosophy of architecture. The unique circular design served to enhance every aspect of the Cinerama experience. The curved screen was the largest ever installed in a Cinerama theater. The only other two (2) "Super-Cinerama" theaters were demolished. One located in St. Louis Park, Minnesota, was demolished to make way for a restaurant and office complex. The other, located in Denver, Colorado, was demolished and replaced with a chain bookstore. The Indian Hills theater showed its last Cinerama film in March 1964. The theater closed on September 28, 2000.

According to David Strohmaier, a Los Angeles filmmaker and producer of a documentary film called "Cinerama Adventure," the Indian Hills Theater was unique. It was unique because of the circular design and extraordinarily large screen. The Indian Hills Theater embodied the culmination of Cinerama design and technology.

National Register of Historic Places criteria

Recommendations for the National Register of Historic Places are made by the state historical society of the state in which a property is located. In the summer of 2001, the Nebraska State Historical Society issued a letter indicating that the Indian Hills Theater was of such architectural and historical importance to the history of cinema on a national basis that it would qualify for listing in the National Register. The letter indicated that the theater met National Register Criteria "A" in that the "Property is associated with events that have made a significant contribution to the broad patterns of our history" and Criteria "C" in that the "Property embodies the distinctive characteristics of a type, period or method of construction or represents the work of a master, or possesses high artistic values, or represents a significant and distinguishable entity whose components lack individual distinction."

Preservation fight and demolition

Theater closure
On September 28, 2000, the theater closed as a result of the national bankruptcy of Carmike Cinemas. The final film presented was Turn It Up.

In April 2001 it was announced that the theater and an adjacent office building had been sold to a local health care provider, Nebraska Methodist Health Systems, Inc. Nebraska Methodist is one of the largest health care providers in Nebraska and operates Methodist Hospital in Omaha, numerous clinics and the Nebraska Methodist College nursing college, the latter of which was located adjacent to the theater property. The nursing college has since moved to the Nebraska Methodist College Josie Harper Campus.

Shortly after the announcement of the theater's sale, Nebraska Methodist was contacted by Ed Reitan, a Los Angeles developer of air traffic control systems and winner of a 1989 technical Emmy Award for his restoration of the earliest television color videotapes. Reitan had been raised in Omaha and maintained a second home there. Reitan reported in a posting on In70mm.com: "Pleas from myself in direct meetings with NMHS to at least save and use the central Cinerama theater for their own auditorium were ignored." Communications from the American Society of Cinematographers were similarly ignored by Nebraska Methodist.

Indian Hills Investment Group
In the spring of 2001 a group of three Cinerama enthusiasts, referred to informally as the "Indian Hills Investment Group," approached Nebraska Methodist regarding the possibility of leasing the theater, with the intent of reopening for screenings of regular commercial films and periodic Cinerama showings. The Investment Group consisted of Larry Karstens of Omaha; Matt Lutthans of Everett, Washington, a school teacher formerly involved in the preservation of the Seattle Martin Cinerama Theater; and Rich Vincent of Denver, the former manager of the Denver Cooper Cinerama. After numerous unsuccessful attempts to meet with the new owner, the Investment Group was informed that a meeting would be held on June 20, 2001.

After the meeting on the morning of June 20, 2001, Karstens and Lutthans were asked to be present for a press conference scheduled for later that day in front of the theater. At the press conference, covered by local television and radio, the Nebraska Methodist CEO announced: "We both jointly concluded that probably it just didn't make a lot of sense to plow a bunch of money into [the theater]" and that the theater would be razed by the end of the summer.

Reitan stated at the time in a posting on In70mm.com:

Incredibly, Larry Karstens and Matt Lutthans, who that same day had expected to negotiate a lease from Methodist to resume film exhibition, appeared with NMHS at that press conference and made statements in support of the Methodist action. This may have terminally damaged any other hopes to save the Indian Hills. After they could not get their lease of the Indian Hills, they expressed no other need or approach for preservation and expressed their agreement with the Methodist action. Methodist nicely had the whole package wrapped up in one short day, with the assistance and blessing of Karstens and Lutthans!

Unknown to Reitan at the time, Karstens and Lutthans were discussing the approach to be used at the press conference with legal advisors both in Omaha and Los Angeles (including talks with Robert Nudelman of Hollywood Heritage), immediately following the morning meeting.

On June 22, 2001, the Methodist Health System's employee newsletter "Newstime" stated: "Methodist Health System has offered to donate the theater furnishings left behind, including the screen, projectors, curtains and most of the seats, to a group (the Investment Group) who wished to operate the Indian Hills building as a movie theater. The group is also welcome to any architecturally significant items." The June 29, 2001 issue of "Newstime" stated that the news conference had been "well-represented by the local media" and followed "a meeting between MHS officials and a national cinerama interest group, who jointly concluded that shared use of the building was not economically viable." Karstens, Rich, and Lutthans have all stated since that their appearance at the press conference was not meant as any sort of endorsement of the views put forth by Methodist Health System.

Indian Hills Theater Preservation Society
Following the "Newstime" announcements, the Indian Hills Theater Preservation Society was founded with the goal of preserving the theater. Leaders of the Society were Steve Dawes, Ron A. Hunter, Tom Hunter, Frank Merwald and Susie Rose. The Society was assisted by letters of support to the local newspaper from film industry members such as Kirk Douglas, Charlton Heston, Janet Leigh, Patricia Neal, Robert Wise, Richard D. Zanuck, and Ray Bradbury. Bruce A. Crawford was largely responsible for facilitating the involvement of the Hollywood industry. Additionally, film historian Leonard Maltin appeared in a public-service commercial that aired on local television and radio in support of the Society. However, the CEO of Nebraska Methodist, Stephen Long, refused to discuss any alternative to immediate demolition.

Omaha Landmarks Heritage Preservation Commission
On August 8, 2001, a hearing was held before the Omaha Landmarks Heritage Preservation Commission to determine whether the Indian Hills Theater should be designated an Omaha Landmark. Such a designation, upon confirmation by the Omaha City Council, would protect the theater from demolition. Presentations were made by the Indian Hills Theater Preservation Society and attorneys for Nebraska Methodist. Filmmaker and Cinerama historian David Strohmaier stated, in video testimony, that the Indian Hills was "the finest venue for wide-screen films in the world." The Commission voted unanimously to recommend to the Omaha City Council that the theater be designated a "Landmark of the City of Omaha."

Demolition and disposal of contents
On August 20, 2001, before the Omaha City Council had a chance to vote on the Preservation Commission's landmark recommendation, Nebraska Methodist demolished the theater. Lutthans commented: "When the wrecking ball hit, I literally cried, it was such a disappointment. That was the finest theatre I had ever seen in my life, and the last of its kind, and everybody involved put in so much work, and now the space is a beautifully paved, empty parking lot. Just sickening."

Nebraska Methodist subsequently gave Karstens some of the contents of the theater. Everything else from the demolition was donated to various theater/arts groups in the area, including the Rose Blumkin Performing Arts Center.

References

External links
Saving the Indian Hills on IMDb.
Film Threat review of Saving the Indian Hills documentary ]

Cinemas and movie theaters in Omaha, Nebraska
Cinerama venues
Demolished theatres in the United States
Demolished buildings and structures in Omaha, Nebraska
Former cinemas in the United States
Landmarks in Omaha, Nebraska
Buildings and structures demolished in 2001